The Perry Index is a widely used index of "Aesop's Fables" or "Aesopica", the fables credited to Aesop, the storyteller who lived in ancient Greece between 620 and 560 BC. The index was created by Ben Edwin Perry, a professor of classics at the University of Illinois Urbana-Champaign.

Modern scholarship takes the view that Aesop probably did not compose all of the fables attributed to him; indeed, a few are known to have first been used before Aesop lived, while the first record we have of many others is from well over a millennium after his time. Traditionally, Aesop's fables were arranged alphabetically, which is not helpful to the reader. Perry listed them by language (Greek then Latin), chronologically, by source, and then alphabetically; the Spanish scholar Francisco Rodríguez Adrados created a similar system. This system also does not help the casual reader, but is the best for scholarly purposes.

Index

Perry 1–100

Perry 1. Eagle and Fox

Perry 2. Eagle, Jackdaw and Shepherd

Perry 3. Eagle and Beetle

Perry 4. Hawk and Nightingale

Perry 5. The Athenian Debtor

Perry 6. The Goatherd and the Wild Goats

Perry 7. Cat as Physician and the Hens

Perry 8. Aesop at the Shipyard

Perry 9. The Fox and the Goat in the Well

Perry 10. Fox and Lion

Perry 11. The Fisherman Pipes to the Fish

Perry 12. Fox and Leopard

Perry 13. The Fisherman

Perry 14. The Ape boasting to the Fox about his Ancestry

Perry 15. The Fox and the Grapes out of Reach

Perry 16. The Cat and the Cock

Perry 17. The Fox without a Tail

Perry 18. The Fisherman and the Little Fish

Perry 19. The Fox and the Thornbush

Perry 20. Fox and Crocodile

Perry 21. The Fishermen and the Tunny

Perry 22. The Fox and the Woodcutter

Perry 23. Cocks and Partridge

Perry 24. The Fox with the Swollen Belly

Perry 25. The Halcyon

Perry 26. A Fisherman

Perry 27. The Fox looks at the Actor's Mask

Perry 28. The Cheater

Perry 29. The Charcoal Dealer and the Fuller

Perry 30. The Shipwrecked Man (referenced under Hercules and the Wagoner)

Perry 31. The Middle-aged Man and his Two Mistresses

Perry 32. The Murderer

Perry 33. The Braggart

Perry 34. Impossible Promises

Perry 35. The Man and the Satyr

Perry 36. Evil-wit

Perry 37. A Blind Man

Perry 38. The Ploughman and the Wolf

Perry 39. The Wise Swallow

Perry 40. The Astrologer

Perry 41. Fox and Lamb

Perry 42. The Farmer's Bequest to his Sons

Perry 43. Two Frogs

Perry 44. The Frogs ask Zeus for a King

Perry 45. The Oxen and the Squeaking-Axle

Perry 46. The North Wind and the Sun

Perry 47. The Boy with the Stomach-Ache

Perry 48. The Nightingale and the Bat

Perry 49. The Herdsman who lost a Calf

Perry 50. The Weasel and Aphrodite

Perry 51. The Farmer and the Snake

Perry 52. The Farmer and his Dogs

Perry 53. The Farmer's Sons

Perry 54. The Snails in the Fire

Perry 55. The Woman and her Overworked Maidservants

Perry 56. The Witch

Perry 57. The Old Woman and the Thieving Physician

Perry 58. The Overfed Hen (referenced under The Goose that Laid the Golden Eggs)

Perry 59. Weasel and File

Perry 60. The Old Man and Death

Perry 61. Fortune and the Farmer

Perry 62. The Dolphins at War and the Gudgeon (or Crab)

Perry 63. Demades the Orator

Perry 64. The Wrong Remedy for Dog-bite

Perry 65. The Travellers and the Bear

Perry 66. The Youngsters in the Butcher's Shop

Perry 67. The Wayfarers who Found an Axe

Perry 68. The Enemies

Perry 69. Two Frogs were Neighbours

Perry 70. The Oak and the Reed

Perry 71. The Timid and Covetous Man who found a Lion made of Gold

Perry 72. The Beekeeper

Perry 73. The Ape and the Dolphin

Perry 74. The Stag at the Fountain

Perry 75. The One-eyed Stag

Perry 76. The Stag and the Lion in a Cave

Perry 77. The Stag and the Vine

Perry 78. The Passengers at Sea

Perry 79. Cat and Mice

Perry 80. The Flies in the Honey

Perry 81. The Ape and the Fox

Perry 82. Ass, Cock, and Lion

Perry 83. The Ape and the Camel

Perry 84. The Two Beetles

Perry 85. The Pig and the Sheep

Perry 86. The Thrush

Perry 87. The Goose that Laid the Golden Eggs

Perry 88. Hermes and the Statuary

Perry 89. Hermes and Tiresias

Perry 90. Viper and Watersnake

Perry 91. The Ass who would be Playmate to his Master

Perry 92. The Two Dogs

Perry 93. The Viper and the File

Perry 94. The Father and his Two Daughters

Perry 95. The Ill-tempered Wife

Perry 96. Viper and Fox

Perry 97. The Young Goat and the Wolf as Musicians

Perry 98. The Kid on the House-top and the Wolf

Perry 99. A Statue of Hermes on Sale

Perry 100. Zeus, Prometheus, Athena and Momus

Perry 101–200

Perry 101. The Jackdaw in Borrowed Feathers

Perry 102. Hermes and Earth

Perry 103. Hermes and the Artisans

Perry 104. Zeus and Apollo, a Contest in Archery

Perry 105. Man's Years

Perry 106. Zeus and the Tortoise

Perry 107. Zeus and the Fox

Perry 108. Zeus and Man

Perry 109. Zeus and Shame

Perry 110. The Hero

Perry 111. Heracles and Plutus

Perry 112. Ant and Beetle

Perry 113. The Tunny and the Dolphin

Perry 114. The Physician at the Funeral

Perry 115. The Fowler and the Asp

Perry 116. The Crab and the Fox

Perry 117. The Camel who wanted Horns

Perry 118. The Beaver

Perry 119. The Gardener watering his Vegetables

Perry 120. The Gardener and his Dog

Perry 121. The Cithara Player

Perry 122. The Thieves and the Cock

Perry 123. The Jackdaw and the Crows

Perry 124. Fox and Crow

Perry 125. The Crow and the Raven

Perry 126. Jackdaw and Fox

Perry 127. The Crow and the Dog

Perry 128. The Crow and the Snake

Perry 129. The Jackdaw and the Pigeons

Perry 130. The Stomach and the Feet

Perry 131. The Jackdaw fleeing from Captivity

Perry 132. The Dog who would chase a Lion

Perry 133. The Dog with the Meat and his Shadow

Perry 134. The Sleeping Dog and the Wolf

Perry 135. The Famished Dogs

Perry 136. The Dog and the Hare

Perry 137. The Gnat and the Bull

Perry 138. The Hares and the Frogs

Perry 139. The Sea-gull and the Kite

Perry 140. The Lion in Love

Perry 141. The Lion and the Frog

Perry 142. The Aged Lion and the Fox

Perry 143. The Lion and the Bull invited to Dinner

Perry 144. The Lion in the Farmer's Yard

Perry 145. Lion and Dolphin

Perry 146. The Lion startled by a Mouse

Perry 147. Lion and Bear

Perry 148. The Lion and the Hare

Perry 149. The Lion, Ass, and Fox

Perry 150. The Lion and the Mouse

Perry 151. The Lion and the Ass Hunting

Perry 152. The Brigand and the Mulberry Tree

Perry 153. The Wolves and the Sheep

Perry 154. The Wolf and the Horse

Perry 155. The Wolf and the Lamb

Perry 156. The Wolf and the Heron

Perry 157. The Wolf and the Goat

Perry 158. The Wolf and the Old Woman Nurse

Perry 159. Wolf and Sheep (Three True Statements)

Perry 160. The Disabled Wolf and the Sheep

Perry 161. The Fortune-teller

Perry 162. The Baby and the Crow

Perry 163. Zeus and the Bees

Perry 164. The Mendicant Priests

Perry 165. Battle of the Mice and Cats

Perry 166. The Ant (noticed under The Ant and the Grasshopper)

Perry 167. The Fly

Perry 168. The Shipwrecked Man

Perry 169. The Prodigal Young Man and the Swallow

Perry 170. Physician and Sick Man

Perry 171. Bat, Thorn Bush, and Gull

Perry 172. The Bat and the Two Weasels

Perry 173. Hermes and the Woodcutter

Perry 174. Fortune and the Traveller by the Well

Perry 175. The Travellers and the Plane Tree

Perry 176. The Man who warmed a Snake

Perry 177. The Driftwood on the Sea

Perry 178. The Traveller's Offering to Hermes

Perry 179. The Ass and Gardener

Perry 180. The Ass with a Burden of Salt

Perry 181. The Ass and the Mule

Perry 182. The Ass carrying the Image of a God

Perry 183. The Wild Ass and the Tame Ass (noticed under The Dog and the Wolf)

Perry 184. The Ass and the Cicadas

Perry 185. The Donkeys make a Petition to Zeus

Perry 186. The Ass and his Driver

Perry 187. The Wolf as Physician

Perry 188. Ass in Lion's Skin

Perry 189. The Ass and the Frogs

Perry 190. Ass, Crow, and Wolf

Perry 191. The Fox betrays the Ass

Perry 192. The Hen and the Swallow

Perry 193. The Fowler and the Lark

Perry 194. The Fowler and the Stork

Perry 195. The Camel seen for the First Time (noticed under The Lion and the Fox)

Perry 196. The Snake and the Crab

Perry 197. Snake, Weasel and Mice

Perry 198. Zeus and the Downtrodden Snake

Perry 199. The Boy and the Scorpion

Perry 200. The Thief and his Mother

Perry 201–300

Perry 201. The Pigeon and the Picture

Perry 202. The Pigeon and the Crow

Perry 203. The Ape and the Fisherman

Perry 204. The Rich Man and the Tanner

Perry 205. The Hired Mourners

Perry 206. Shepherd and Dog

Perry 207. The Shepherd and the Sea

Perry 208. The Shepherd and his Sheep

Perry 209. The Shepherd and the Young Wolves

Perry 210. The Shepherd who cried "Wolf!" in Jest

Perry 211. The Boy bathing in the River

Perry 212. The Sheep unskillfully Sheared

Perry 213. Pomegranate, Apple Tree, and Bramble

Perry 214. The Mole

Perry 215. The Wasps and the Partridges

Perry 216. The Wasp and the Snake

Perry 217. The Bull and the Wild Goats

Perry 218. The Ape's Twin Offspring

Perry 219. The Peacock and the Jackdaw

Perry 220. Camel and Elephant, Candidates for King

Perry 221. Zeus and the Snake

Perry 222. The Sow and the Bitch

Perry 223. A Dispute concerning Fecundity

Perry 224. The Wild Boar and the Fox

Perry 225. The Miser and his Gold

Perry 226. The Tortoise and the Hare

Perry 227. The Swallow nesting on the Courthouse

Perry 228. The Geese and the Cranes

Perry 229. The Swallow and the Crow

Perry 230. The Turtle takes Lessons from the Eagle

Perry 231. The Athlete and the Flea

Perry 232. The Foxes at the Meander River

Perry 233. The Swan and his Owner (Referenced under The Swan and the Goose)

Perry 234. The Wolf and the Shepherd (Referenced under The Wolf in Sheep's Clothing)

Perry 235. The Ant and the Dove

Perry 236. The Travellers and the Crow

Perry 237. A Donkey Bought on Approval

Perry 238. The Fowler and the Pigeons

Perry 239. The Depositary and the god Horkos (Oath)

Perry 240. Prometheus and Men

Perry 241. Cicada and Fox

Perry 242. The Hyena and the Fox

Perry 243. The Hyenas

Perry 244. The Parrot and the Cat (Partridge and Cat)

Perry 245. The Timid Soldier and the Crows

Perry 246. The Wife and her Drunken Husband

Perry 247. Diogenes on a Journey

Perry 248. Diogenes and the Bald Man

Perry 249. The Dancing Camel

Perry 250. The Nut Tree 

Perry 251. The Lark

Perry 252. The Dog, the Rooster, and the Fox

Perry 253. Dog and Shellfish

Perry 254. Dog and Butcher

Perry 255. Mosquito and Lion

Perry 256. Hares and Foxes

Perry 257. Lioness and Fox

Perry 258. The Sick Lion, the Wolf, and Fox

Perry 259. The Lion, Prometheus, and the Elephant

Perry 260. The Wolf admiring his Shadow

Perry 261. The Wolf and the Lamb

Perry 262. The Trees and the Olive

Perry 263. The Ass and the Mule

Perry 264. The Ass and his Fellow Traveller the Dog

Perry 265. The Fowler and the Partridge

Perry 266. The Two Wallets

Perry 267. The Shepherd and the Wolf that he brought up with his Dogs (Referenced under The Wolf in Sheep's Clothing)

Perry 268. The Caterpillar and the Snake (Referenced under The Frog and the Ox)

Perry 269. The Wild Boar, the Horse, and the Hunter

Perry 270. The Wall and the Stake

Perry 271. Winter and Spring

Perry 272. Man and Flea

Perry 273. The Flea and the Ox

Perry 274. Good Things and Evil

Perry 275. The Eagle who had his Wings Cropped

Perry 276. The Eagle Wounded by an Arrow

Perry 277. The Nightingale and the Swallow

Perry 278. The Athenian and the Theban

Perry 279. The Goat and the Ass

Perry 280. Goat and Goatherd

Perry 281. The Fighting Cocks

Perry 282. Little Fish escape the Net

Perry 283. The Fire-Bearing Fox

Perry 284. The Man and the Lion travelling together

Perry 285. The Man who broke a Statue of Hermes

Perry 286. Spider and Lizard

Perry 287. The Arab and his Camel

Perry 288. The Bear and the Fox

Perry 289. The Frog Physician

Perry 290. The Oxen and the Butchers

Perry 291. The Ox-driver and Heracles

Perry 292. Ox and Ass Ploughing

Perry 293. The Weasel Caught

Perry 294. The Crane and the Peacock

Perry 295. The Farmer who lost his Mattock

Perry 296. The Farmer and the Eagle

Perry 297. Farmer and Cranes

Perry 298. Farmer and Starlings

Perry 299. The Farmer and the Tree

Perry 300. The Steer and the Bull

Perry 301–400

Perry 301. The Slave Girl and Aphrodite

Perry 302. The Oak Trees and Zeus - noticed under The Woodcutter and the Trees

Perry 303. The Woodcutters and the Pine

Perry 304. The Fir Tree and the Thistle

Perry 305. The Sick Stag and his Friends

Perry 306. Hermes and a Man bitten by an Ant

Perry 307. Hermes and the Sculptor

Perry 308. The Dog and the Square-hewn Statue of Hermes

Perry 309. Hermes with a Wagon full of Lies among the Arabs

Perry 310. The Eunuch and the Soothsayer

Perry 311. Zeus, the Animals, and Men

Perry 312. Zeus and the Jar full of Good Things

Perry 313. The Judgments of Zeus

Perry 314. The Frogs and the Sun

Perry 315. The Mule

Perry 316. Heracles and Athena

Perry 317. The Unskilled Physician

Perry 318. The Old Race Horse in the Mill

Perry 319. The Horse and his Groom

Perry 320. The Soldier and his Horse

Perry 321. The Camel in the River

Perry 322. The Crab and his Mother (noticed under The Snake and the Crab)

Perry 323. The Crow and Hermes

Perry 324. The Sick Crow and his Mother

Perry 325. The Lark and the Farmer

Perry 326. The Timid Hunter

Perry 327. The Hunter and the Fisherman

Perry 328. The Dog at the Banquet

Perry 329. The Hunting Dog

Perry 330. The Dog and his Master

Perry 331. Dog and Hare

Perry 332. The Dog with a Bell on his Neck

Perry 333. The Rabbit and the Fox

Perry 334. The Lion's Reign

Perry 335. The Lion and the Eagle

Perry 336. Sick Lion, Fox, and Stag, referenced in The Deer without a Heart

Perry 337. Lion, Fox, and Ape

Perry 338. The Lion and the Boar

Perry 339. Lion and Wild Ass, Partners in the Hunt

Perry 340. The Lion and the Bowman

Perry 341. The Mad Lion

Perry 342. The Wolves and the Dogs

Perry 343. The Wolves and the Dogs at War

Perry 344. A Wolf among the Lions

Perry 345. The Wolf and the Fox at a Trap

Perry 346. The Wolf and the Well-fed Dog

Perry 347. Wolf and Lion

Perry 348. The Wolf as Governor and the Ass

Perry 349. The Lamp

Perry 350. Adulterer and Husband

Perry 351. The Calf and the Deer

Perry 352. The Country Mouse and the City Mouse

Perry 353. The Mouse and the Bull

Perry 354. The Mouse and the Blacksmiths

Perry 355. The Wayfarer and Truth

Perry 356. The Sheep and the Dog

Perry 357. The Ass that envied the Horse

Perry 358. The Ass in the Lion's Skin

Perry 359. The Donkey on the Tiles

Perry 360. The Ass eating Thorns

Perry 361. The Fowler, the Partridge and the Cock

Perry 362. The Snake's Tail and the Other Members

Perry 363. The Boy and the Painted Lion

Perry 364. The Ape Mother and Zeus

Perry 365. The Shepherd about to enclose a Wolf in the Fold

Perry 366. The Shepherd who reared a Wolf

Perry 367. War and Insolence

Perry 368. The Hide in the River

Perry 369. The Rose and the Amaranth

Perry 370. The Trumpeter

Perry 371. The Lizard and the Snake (Referenced under The Frog and the Ox)

Perry 372. Three Bulls and a Lion

Perry 373. The Cicada and the Ant

Perry 374. The Goat and the Vine

Perry 375. The Baldheaded Horseman

Perry 376. The Toad puffing herself up to equal an Ox

Perry 377. The Boasting Swallow and the Crow

Perry 378. The Two Pots

Perry 379. The Man enamoured of his own Daughter

Perry 380. The Man who evacuated his own Wits

Perry 381. The Aged Farmer and the Donkeys

Perry 382. The Ancestors of the Delphians

Perry 383. The Two Roads

Perry 384. The Frog and the Mouse

Perry 385. Dreams

Perry 386. The Foolish Girl

Perry 387. The Poor Man catching Insects

Perry 388. The Widow and the Ploughman

Perry 389. The Cat's Birthday Dinner

Perry 390. The Crow and the Pitcher

Perry 391. The Landlord and the Sailors

Perry 392. The Sick Donkey and the Wolf Physician

Perry 393. The Aethiopian

Perry 394. The Fox as Helper to the Lion

Perry 395. The Serpent and the Eagle

Perry 396. The Kites and the Swans

Perry 397. The Fowler and the Cicada

Perry 398. The Crow and the Swan (noticed under Washing the Ethiopian white)

Perry 399. The Swan that was caught instead of a Goose

Perry 400. The Bees and the Shepherd

Perry 401–500

Perry 401. The Foal

Perry 402. The Hunter and the Horseman

Perry 403. The Hunter and the Dog

Perry 404. Hunter and Wolf

Perry 405. Cyclops

Perry 406. Dogs tearing a Lion's Skin

Perry 407. A Dog, chasing a Wolf

Perry 408. A Thirsty Rabbit descended into a Well

Perry 409. The Fox and the Lion in a Cage

Perry 410. The Youth and the Woman

Perry 411. The Onager and the Ass (noticed under The Dog and the Wolf)

Perry 412. The Rivers and the Sea

Perry 413. The Fig and the Olive

Perry 414. The Bull, Lioness, and the Wild Boar

Perry 415. The Dog and the Smiths

Perry 416. A Bear, a Fox, and a Lion hunted together

Perry 417. A Wolf and Lycophron

Perry 418. The Ostrich

Perry 419. The Thief and the Innkeeper

Perry 420. The Two Adulterers

Perry 421. The Sailor and his Son

Perry 422. The Eagle once a Man

Perry 423. Aesop and the Bitch

Perry 424. Aesop to the Corinthians

Perry 425. The Fisherman and the Octopus

Perry 426. Fox and Crane

Perry 427. Fox and Hedgehog

Perry 428. The Sybarite and the Chariot

Perry 429. The Man who tried to count the Waves

Perry 430. The Creation of Man

Perry 431. Man's Loquacity

Perry 432. Apollo, the Muses and the Dryads

Perry 433. Aphrodite and the Merchant

Perry 434. The Wren on the Eagle's Back

Perry 435. The Black Cat

Perry 436. The Priest of Cybele and the Lion

Perry 437. The Owl and the Birds

Perry 438. The Sybarite Woman and the Jug

Perry 439. The Laurel and the Olive

Perry 440. The Runaway Slave

Perry 441. The Feast Day and the Day After

Perry 442. The Origin of Blushes

Perry 443. Heron and Buzzard

Perry 444. Eros among Men

Perry 445. Pleasure and Pain

Perry 446. The Cuckoo and the Little Birds

Perry 447. The Crested Lark, burying her Father

Perry 448. The Musical Dogs

Perry 449. The Dog's House

Perry 450. The Lions and the Hares

Perry 451. The Wolf in Sheep's Clothing

Perry 452. The Wolf and the Ass on Trial

Perry 453. The Wolf and the Shepherds

Perry 454. The Mouse and the Oyster

Perry 455. Momus and Aphrodite

Perry 456. The Fool and the Sieve

Perry 457. The Boy on the Wild Horse

Perry 458. The Ass and the Snake called Dipsas

Perry 459. The Peeping of an Ass

Perry 460. The Shadow of an Ass

Perry 461. The Eyes and the Mouth

Perry 462. The Privilege of Grief

Perry 463. The Dancing Apes

Perry 464. The Apes Founding a City

Perry 465. The Shepherd and the Butcher

Perry 466. Plenty and Poverty

Perry 467. The Satyr and Fire

Perry 468. The Moon and her Mother

Perry 469. The Bull deceived by the Lion

Perry 470. The Cicadas

Perry 471. The Lice and the Farmer

Perry 472. The Vainglorious Jackdaw and the Peacock

Perry 473. The Sparrow gives Advice to the Hare

Perry 474. The Wolf and the Fox before Judge Ape

Perry 475. From Cobbler to Physician

Perry 476. What the Ass said to the Old Shepherd

Perry 477. Sheep, Stag, and Wolf

Perry 478. Sheep, Dog, and Wolf

Perry 479. Woman in Childbirth

Perry 480. Dog and her Puppies

Perry 481. The Old Lion, the Boar, the Bull, and the Ass

Perry 482. The Dogs and the Crocodiles

Perry 483. The Dog, the Treasure and the Vulture

Perry 484. The Ass insults the Boar

Perry 485. The Frogs Dread the Battle of the Bulls

Perry 486. The Kite and the Doves

Perry 487. The Bullock, the Lion, and the Robber

Perry 488. The Eagle, the Cat, and the Wild Sow

Perry 489. Caesar to a Flunkey

Perry 490. The Eagle and the Crow

Perry 491. The Two Mules and the Robbers

Perry 492. The Stag and the Oxen

Perry 493. What the Old Woman said to the Wine Jar

Perry 494. The Panther and the Shepherds

Perry 495. Aesop and the Farmer

Perry 496. The Butcher and the Ape

Perry 497. Aesop and the Saucy Fellow

Perry 498. The Fly and the Mule

Perry 499. Brother and Sister

Perry 500. Socrates to his Friends

Perry 501–584

Perry 501. On Believing and Not Believing

Perry 502. The Eunuch's Reply to the Scurrilous Person

Perry 503. The Cockerel and the Pearl

Perry 504. The Bees and the Drones get Judgment from the Wasp

Perry 505. Concerning Relaxation and Tension

Perry 506. The Dog to the Lamb

Perry 507. The Cicada and the Owl

Perry 508. Trees under the Patronage of the Gods

Perry 509. The Peacock complains to Juno about his Voice

Perry 510. Aesop's Reply to an Inquisitive Fellow

Perry 511. The Weasel and the Mice - Noticed under The Cat and the Mice

Perry 512. The Enigmatic Will

Perry 513. The Thief and his Lamp

Perry 514. The Rule of King Lion

Perry 515. Prometheus

Perry 516. The Bearded She-Goats

Perry 517. The Dogs send an Embassy to Jupiter

Perry 518. The Fox and the Dragon

Perry 519. About Simonides

Perry 520. The Mountain in Labour

Perry 521. The Ant and the Fly

Perry 522. How Simonides was saved by the Gods

Perry 523. King Demetrius and the Poet Menander

Perry 524. Two Soldiers and a Robber

Perry 525. The Bald Man and the Fly

Perry 526. The Ass and the Pig's Barley

Perry 527. The Buffoon and the Country Fellow

Perry 528. Two Bald Men

Perry 529. Prince, the Fluteplayer

Perry 530. Time (Opportunity)

Perry 531. The Bull and the Calf

Perry 532. The Old Dog and the Hunter

Perry 533. The Ape and the Fox

Perry 534. Mercury and the Two Women

Perry 535. Prometheus and Guile

Perry 536. On Apollo's Oracle

Perry 537. Aesop and the Writer

Perry 538. Pompey and his Soldier

Perry 539. Juno, Venus, and the Hen

Perry 540. The Bullock and the Old Ox

Perry 541. Aesop and the Victorious Athlete

Perry 542. The Ass and the Lyre

Perry 543. The Widow and the Soldier

Perry 544. The Two Suitors

Perry 545. Aesop and the his Mistress

Perry 546. The Cock carried in a litter by Cats

Perry 547. The Sow giving birth and the Wolf

Perry 548. Aesop and the Runaway Slave

Perry 549. The Race Horse

Perry 550. When the Bear gets Hungry

Perry 551. The Traveller and the Raven

Perry 552. The Snake and the Lizard

Perry 553. The Crow and the Sheep

Perry 554. Socrates and a Worthless Servant

Perry 555. The Harlot and the Young Man

Perry 556. The Butterfly and the Wasp

Perry 557. The Ground-Swallow and the Fox

Perry 558. Two Cocks and a Hawk

Perry 559. The Snail and the Mirror

Perry 560. The Bald Man and the Gardener

Perry 561. The Owl, the Cat, and the Mouse

Perry 562. The Partridge and the Fox (The Rooster and the Fox)

Perry 563. The Lion and the Shepherd

Perry 564. The Gnat and the Bull

Perry 565. The Disdainful Horse

Perry 566. The Bat

Perry 567. The Nightingale and the Hawk

Perry 568. The Envious Fox and the Wolf

Perry 569. The King of the Apes

Perry 570. The Goose and the Stork

Perry 571. The Obliging Horse

Perry 572. The Kid and the Wolf

Perry 573. The Domestic Snake

Perry 574. The Eagle and the Kite

Perry 575. The Wethers and the Butcher

Perry 576. The Fowler and the Birds

Perry 577. The Crow and the other Birds at Dinner

Perry 578. The Horse, the Lion and the Goats

Perry 579. The Sword and the Passer-by

Perry 580. The Covetous Man and the Envious Man

Perry 581. The Boy and the Thief

Perry 582. The Farmer and his Ox

Perry 583. The Pig without a Heart, referenced in The Deer without a Heart

Perry 584. The River-fish and the Sea-fish

Extended Perry

Paulus Diaconus

585. Sick Lion, Fox and Bear. cf. 258

586. Calf and Stork

587. Flea and Gout

Odo of Cheriton

588. Hawk and Doves

589. Bird of Saint Martin

590. Stork and his Beak (Magpie and her Tail)

591. Toad and Beautiful Son

592. Cat as Monk

593. Fox and Wolf in Well

594. Cat, Rat, and Cheese

595. Isengrim as Monk

596. Complaint of Sheep against Wolf

597. Fox Confesses Sins to Rooster

598. Wasp and Spier

599. Eagle and Crow Physician

600. Donkey and Pig

601. Hen, Chicks and Kite

602. Dinner at the Lion's House

603. Goose and Crow

604. Kite Imitates Hawk

605. Fox and Cat

606. Crow and Dove (cf. 567)

607. Wolf's Funeral

608. Dirty Dog

609. Man and Unicorn

610. Fox and Ferryman

611. Fox and Hens

612. Falcon and Kite

613. Belling the Cat

614. Owl and Birds

615. Mouse in Wine Jar and Cat

616. Hare Contends with Wolf

617. Serpent in Man's Bostom

618. Ungrateful Man

619. Mouse in quest of Mate

620. Stork and Serpent

621. Peacock stripped of Feathers

622. Toad and Frog

623. Athenian Philosopher / Goat and Donkey

624. Aged Father and Cruel Son

625. Wolf as Fisherman and Fox

626. Cuckoo and Eagle

627. Nightingale and Bowman

628. Wolf Confessor to Fox and Donkey

629. Rustic Invited to Dinner

630. Rustic Reared in Cow Barn

631. King of Greece and his Brother

632. Julian the Apostate and a Demon

633. Man Condemned to be Hanged

634. Philosopher who spit in King's Beard

635. Judgments of God revealed by Angel

636. Wolf and Sheep Kissing Each Other

637. Tame Asp

638. Ass with Privilege, Fox and Wolf

639. Eagle and Rat

640. Soldier and Serpent / Dragon and Peasant

641. Wolf and Priest

642. Soldier and Religious Man

643. Ape and Merchant

John of Schepey

644. Buzzard and hawk

645. Lion and unicorn

Metrical

646. Capon and hawk

647. Merchant and wife

Neckham

648. Vulture and eagle

Rhymed verse

649. Stag, hedgehog and boar

Robert's Romulus

650. Presumptuous beetle

651. Rustic and his wife

652. Cuckoo and birds

653. Farmer sold his horse

654. Eagle, hawk and crane

655. Wolf fasting for Lent

656. Swallow and sparrows

657. Cattle hauling dung

658. Hare wanted horns

659. Wolf and beetle

Brussels

660. Thief and beetle

661. Wife and Paramour

662. Thief and Satan

663. Dragon's Deposit

664. Hermit Tested Servant

665. Farmer Prayed for Horse

666. Man Praying for Himself

667. Townsman and Tame Daw

668. Three Wishes

669. Fox and Shadow of Moon as Cheese

670. Wolf sees Crow on Sheep

671. Fox and Dove

672. Eagle, Hawk, Doves

673. Horse and grain

674. Horse and Goat in package deal

675. Wolf and Hedgehog

676. Well-Meaning Wolves

677. Painter and Wife

678. Deer instructing Fawn

679. Crow and Young Ones

680. Goat and Wolf

681. Contentious Wife

682. Contrary Wife

683. Whispering Brigands

684. Physician, Rich Man and Daughter

685. Badger among Pigs

686. Wolf in Trap and Hedgehog

687. Wolf and Ferryman

688. Wolf Learning Letters

689. Wolf and Dove Gathering Twigs

690. Man in Boat

691. Old Man and Son

692. Bishop Cat

Extravagantes

693. Unlucky Wolf, Fox and Mule (written on hoof)

694. Little Boar

695. He-Goat and Wolf

696. Wolf and Ass

697. Serpent as Adviser

698. Wolf as Fisherman

699. Wolf's Misfortune

700. Hunter and Ploughman

701. Dog and Wolf

702. Dog in Manger

703. Three Sons Dividing Inheritance

704. Little Fox under Wolf's Tutelage

705. Dog, Wolf and Ram

706. Lion's Son learns about Man

707. Knight and Mendacious Squire

Bern

708. Ape and Bear

709. Dog and Slain Master

710. Dog and Boy in River

711. Ram and Baldheaded Master

712. Wolf and Hungry Fox

713. Adulterous Stork

714. Ram and Wolf

715. Fox and Sick Ape

716. Mouse and Daughter

717. Rooster and Horse Talking about Master

718. Generous Fox and Wolf

719. Dog begging Bone from Master

Promptuarium
720. Scarecrow

Poggio and Abstemius
721. Father, Son, and Donkey

722. Teaching Donkey to Read

723. Rustic Wanting to Cross River

724. Fly on Chariot

725. Fish from Frying Pan into Coals

Notes

Ancient Greek works
Fables
Aesop's Fables
Lists of stories